Azmy is an Egyptian surname. Notable people with the surname include:
Amir Azmy (born 1983), Egyptian retired footballer
Baher Azmy,  American lawyer and professor of law at Seton Hall University
Nora Azmy (born 2000), Egyptian synchronized swimmer
Zakaria Azmy  (born 1938), former chief of presidential staff in Egypt

References

Arabic-language surnames